Georgina Collin (born 17 February 1997) is an Australian female canoeist who was twice 6th in the senior final, of the C2 classic in 2016 and in C2 sprint in 2019, at the Wildwater Canoeing World Championships.

Biography
Before moving permanently on to wildwater canoeing, Collin won two medals at the international competition at youth level in canoe slalom.

Achievements

See also
Madison Wilson (canoeist), with Georgina Collin at 2019 Wildwater Canoeing World Championships

References

External links
 
 Georgina Collin at Paddle Australia

1997 births
Living people
Australian female canoeists
Sportspeople from Perth, Western Australia